Highway 87 is a 35 km long east-west highway in northern Israel and the Israeli-occupied Golan Heights. It extends from the northern shores of Lake Kinneret through the central Golan Heights. It begins in the west at Kfar Nahum/Capernaum and ends in the east at Bashan Junction.

Junctions & Interchanges on the highway

Places of interest near Highway 87
 Tabgha/Ein Sheva with the Church of the Multiplication and the Church of the Primacy of St. Peter
 Church of the Beatitudes
 Capernaum/Kfar Nahum – the Franciscan side of the archaeological site with the ancient synagogue, and the Greek Orthodox side and monastery
 Arik Bridge
 Bethsaida, Bethsaida Valley and 
 Yehudiya Forest Nature Reserve and Yehudiya Stream
 Memorial statue for the IDF's 7th brigade
 Husayniyah (חושנייה)

See also
List of highways in Israel

Roads in Israel
Roads in Israeli-occupied territories